Dennis H. Gabryszak (born November 18, 1951) is an American former politician from the state of New York. A Democrat, Gabryszak was a member of the New York State Assembly for the 143rd district from 2007 until his January 2014 resignation.

Life and career
Gabryszak is of Polish heritage.

Gabryszak served as trustee on the Board of Trustees for Depew, New York in 1981. In 1984, he was elected to the Cheektowaga Town Board; he served as supervisor of Cheektowaga from 1993 to 2006.

Gabryszak was first elected to the New York State Assembly in 2006.

Harassment allegations and resignation
In December 2013, three of Gabryszak's former legislative staffers accused him of sexual harassment. By January 2014, that number had grown to seven. New York Governor Andrew Cuomo stated that Gabryszak should address the sexual harassment allegations or resign. Gabryszak resigned his Assembly seat on January 12, 2014.

External links
New York State Assembly Website

References

1951 births
Living people
American politicians of Polish descent
Democratic Party members of the New York State Assembly
University at Buffalo alumni
People from Cheektowaga, New York
21st-century American politicians